Pliocercus euryzonus, commonly known as Cope's false coral snake or the  black halloween snake , is a species of snake in the subfamily Dipsadinae of the family Colubridae. The species is indigenous to southeastern Central America and northwestern South America. There are two recognized subspecies.

Geographic range
P. euryzonus is found in Colombia, Costa Rica, Ecuador, Honduras, Nicaragua, and Panama. The Reptile Database also lists Guatemala and Peru.

Habitat

Reproduction
P. euryzonus is oviparous.

Subspecies
Including the nominotypical subspecies, two subspecies are recognized as being valid.
Pliocercus euryzonus burghardti 
Pliocercus euryzonus euryzonus

Etymology
The subspecific name, burghardti, is in honor of herpetologist Gordon M. Burghardt.

References

Further reading
Cope ED (1862). "Synopsis of the Species of Holcosus and Ameiva, with Diagnoses of new West Indian and South American Colubridæ". Proceedings of the Academy of Natural Sciences of Philadelphia [14]: 60–81. (Pliocercus euryzonus, new species, pp. 72–73).
Freiberg M (1982). Snakes of South America. Hong Kong: T.F.H. Publications. 189 pp. . (Pliocercus euryzonus, p. 107).
Ray JM, Knight JL (2013). The Venomous Snakes and their Mimics of Panama and Costa Rica: Las Cuebras Venenosas y sus Mímicas de Panamá y Costa Rica. Scotts Valley, California: CreateSpace Independent Publishing Platform. 282 pp. .
Savage JM (2002). The Amphibians and Reptiles of Costa Rica: A Herpetofauna between Two Continents, between Two Seas. Chicago and London: University of Chicago Press. xx + 945 pp. . (Urotheca euryzona, p. 642).
Smith HM, Chiszar D (1996). Species-Group Taxa of the False Coral Snake Genus Pliocercus. Pottsville, Pennsylvania: Ramus Publishing, Inc. 112 pp. . (Pliocercus euryzonus burghardti, new subspecies, p. 31).

Colubrids
Snakes of Central America
Snakes of South America
Reptiles of Colombia
Reptiles of Costa Rica
Reptiles of Ecuador
Reptiles of Guatemala
Reptiles of Honduras
Reptiles of Nicaragua
Reptiles of Panama
Reptiles of Peru
Reptiles described in 1862
Taxa named by Edward Drinker Cope